Eta Aquilae (η Aql, η Aquilae) is the Bayer designation for a multiple star in the equatorial constellation of Aquila, the eagle. It was once part of the former constellation Antinous. On average, this star has an apparent visual magnitude of 3.87, making it one of the brighter members of Aquila.

System
The η Aquilae system contains at least two stars, probably three.  The primary star η Aql A is by far the brightest and dominates the spectrum.  An ultraviolet excess in the spectral energy distribution suggest the presence of a faint hot companion, η Aql B, which has been given a spectral type of B8.9 V.  The fractional spectral type is an artefact of the mathematics used to model the spectrum, not an indication of any specific spectral features that would be intermediate between B8 and B9. Radial velocity measurements could not find a satisfactory fit, which suggests that the orbit of η Aql B may be face-on, or very large.

A companion has been resolved visually 0.66" distant, but measurements give this a spectral type of F1 - F5.  It seems likely that the hot star detected in the spectrum is closer and unresolved.  The resolved companion has not been shown to be physically associated, but it is estimated that it would have a period of nearly a thousand years.  Measurements with the HST fine guidance sensors show variations likely to be due to orbital motion on a scale of two years, so η Aql would appear to be a triple system.

Cepheid Variable

η Aquilae A is a Cepheid variable star, discovered by Edward Pigott in 1784.  It has an apparent magnitude that ranges from 3.5 to 4.3 over a period of 7.176641 days. Along with Delta Cephei, Zeta Geminorum and Beta Doradus, it is one of the most prominent naked eye Cepheids; that is, both the star itself and the variation in its brightness can be distinguished with the naked eye. Some other Cepheids such as Polaris are bright but have only a very small variation in brightness.

At the relatively young age of 26 million years, this massive star has burned through the hydrogen fuel at its core and evolved into a supergiant, giving it a baseline stellar classification of F6 Ibv. The periodic pulsations of this star actually cause the stellar class to vary between (F6.5–G2)Ib over the course of each cycle.

Compared to the Sun, Eta Aquilae has around 9 times the mass, roughly 66 times the radius, and is radiating 11,474 times as much luminosity. This energy is being emitted from the outer envelope at an effective temperature of 6,000 K, giving it the yellow-white hued glow of an F-type star.

Name

This star, along with δ Aql and θ Aql, were Al Mizān (ألميزان), the Scale-beam.According to the catalogue of stars in the Technical Memorandum 33-507 - A Reduced Star Catalog Containing 537 Named Stars, Al Mizān was the title for three stars: δ Aql as Al Mizān I, η Aql as Al Mizān II and θ Aql as Al Mizān III.

η Aquilae, together with θ Aql, δ Aql, ι Aql, κ Aql and λ Aql, was part of the obsolete constellation Antinous.

References

External links
 
 Eta Aquilae
 Image Eta Aquilae

Al Mizān II
187929
Aquila (constellation)
Aquilae, Eta
Classical Cepheid variables
F-type supergiants
F-type main-sequence stars
B-type main-sequence stars
Triple star systems
Aquilae, 55
7570
097804
J19522835+0100203
BD+00 4337